The 1939 La Flèche Wallonne was the fourth edition of La Flèche Wallonne cycle race and was held on 18 June 1939. The race started in Mons and finished in Rocourt. The race was won by Edmond Delathouwer.

General classification

References

1939 in road cycling
1939
1939 in Belgian sport